ZD6126 is a vascular-targeting agent and a prodrug of N-acetylcolchinol, related to colchicine.  It has shown promising results on tumors in mice.

A phase I clinical trial identified gastrointestinal and cardiac effects as limiting dosing.  Two phase II clinical trials were suspended investigating ZD6126 in metastatic renal cell carcinoma and metastatic colorectal cancer.

ZD6126 was being investigated by AstraZeneca as a vascular disrupting agent (VDA). However, the trials were halted, after it became apparent that ZD6126 was too cardiotoxic at the required doses.

References 

Phenol ethers
Acetamides
Abandoned drugs